Luther H. Cary was a politician in Wisconsin and California.

Biography
Cary was born Luther Harvey Cary in Erie County, New York in 1824. During the American Civil War, he served in the Union Army. He died on September 16, 1888 in Oakland, California.

Political career
Cary was a member of the Wisconsin State Assembly in 1855 and again in 1867. From 1861 to 1862, he was a member of the Wisconsin State Senate. Cary later served in the California State Assembly from 1883 to 1885. He was also a delegate to the 1864 Republican National Convention.

References

People from Erie County, New York
Republican Party Wisconsin state senators
Republican Party members of the Wisconsin State Assembly
Republican Party members of the California State Assembly
People of Wisconsin in the American Civil War
Union Army soldiers
1824 births
1888 deaths
People from the San Francisco Bay Area
19th-century American politicians